Makilala, officially the Municipality of Makilala, is a 1st class municipality in the province of Cotabato, Philippines. According to the 2020 census, it has a population of 87,927 people.

History
The Municipality of Makilala, formerly a barangay with a name of “Lamitan”, was created by virtue of Executive Order No. 63 issued on September 8, 1954, by then President of the Philippines, Ramon Magsaysay.

The name Makilala is a portmanteau of the names of the early barangays of the area, namely: Malasila, Kisante, and Lamitan. An additional "la" was added to match the Hiligaynon word which means "to be known".

Geography
The municipality of Makilala is located on the south-east portion of Cotabato Province and the last town going to Davao City. It is bounded by the City of Kidapawan in the north, Municipality of M’lang in the west, Province of Davao Del Sur in the south and the Municipality of Tulunan in the south-east.

Barangays
Makilala is politically subdivided into 38 barangays.

Climate

Makilala's climatic condition is characterized by rainfall evenly distributed throughout the year, thus, the springs kept flowing, rivers are alive and farms are productive. The slopes of Mt. Apo, Mt. Libadan, Mt. Gap and Mt. Naponggis serve as rain generators that provide reliable rainfall pattern and cool climate.

Demographics

Economy

Industries in Makilala are Rubber Industry, Woodworks and Agri-industrial products.

Major firms are STANFILCO-DOLE, engaged in cavendish production and rubber processing companies like STANDECO, FARMA, MRDI, PIONEER, LASRI, MRI, and DAVCO. Major wood processing company is RNF Summit. Also Makilala has First Community Radio Fm station Freedom Radio Makilala 107.9 fm

Their agricultural land mostly planted with rubber, rice, coconut, coffee, banana, vegetables and famous fruits such as durian, marang, rambutan and mangosteen.

Tourism
The foothills of Mount Apo, especially the area of Mt. Apo National Park which falls within Barangay Batasan, also contain several waterfalls, most of them hidden away in the old-growth forest within the National Park, while two of the tallest falls, Matibago and Padalagi, are visible from the National Highway. As of now there are no tourist-friendly access to these waterfalls, with them being several hours of hard trekking from the Barangays.
The Barangay of New Israel is situated on the periphery of Mount Apo National Park at an elevation of 1,600 feet above sea level. New Israel was established by the Moncadistas, a religious sect. Aside from being a starting point for hikes up Mt. Apo, it is also home to a troop of monkeys, which are used to interact with humans, and New Israel Eco Park, with Asia's longest zip-line.
Sang'ngawan Falls is found in the neighboring Barangay of Batasan. It is a collection of cold & hot natural pools, found beside the Malasila river. Its hot sulfuric pools are reputed to have healing effects.
Le Reve Resort is located along National Highway, Makilala, Cotabato. It is an inland resort known for its use of unchlorinated spring water piped from the foothills of Mt. Apo
Don Bosco Youth Camp, also located in Batasan, is a favorite venue for events like seminars, conferences, & weddings.
Camps Cajelo and Aurora are found along the National Highway in Barangay Bulatukan. It is known as the venue for yearly Scouting events in the province.
The access roads to the many barangays of Makilala also make for good mountain biking, with varying degrees of difficulty.

References

External links

Makilala Profile at the DTI Cities and Municipalities Competitive Index
[ Philippine Standard Geographic Code]

Municipalities of Cotabato
Establishments by Philippine executive order